Observe and Report is a 2009 American black comedy film written and directed by Jody Hill and starring Seth Rogen, Anna Faris and Ray Liotta. It follows a mentally unstable vigilante mall cop who attempts to join the police academy and pursues a flasher tormenting female visitors to the mall where he works. It was released on April 10, 2009 and grossed $27 million.

Plot
An anonymous flasher exposes himself to shoppers in the Forest Ridge Mall parking lot. The head of mall security, Ronnie Barnhardt, makes it his mission to apprehend the offender. However, while Ronnie is ostensibly well-intentioned and valiant in his own mind, in reality he is emotionally unstable with vigilante tendencies, apparently experiencing bipolar disorder and displaying violent ideation, among other problems.

The criminal activity at the mall continues as the flasher exposes himself to make-up counter worker Brandi and a masked robber causes property damage at a shoe store. In both instances, Detective Harrison, a police detective, arrives to investigate. The two dislike each other, as Ronnie believes Harrison is taking over his proper role as investigator and Harrison believes that Ronnie is disrupting the investigation.

Ronnie decides to take steps to become a police officer. As part of his preparations, Ronnie decides to ride along with Detective Harrison. Harrison tricks him into walking into the most dangerous part of town and drives off. Ronnie then confronts and subsequently assaults several drug dealers, victoriously returning to the police station with a dealer's son and thanking the detective for the opportunity to prove himself.

Emboldened, Ronnie arranges a date with Brandi. On their date, she sees him taking a prescription clonazepam and assumes that Ronnie takes them recreationally. She asks him to share and he gives her the entire bottle, believing he does not need his prescription anymore. Ronnie takes her home and has sex with her while she is semi-conscious.

Ronnie passes the background check and physical examination for the police officer job, but fails the psychological examination. Nell, a friendly food court worker, tearfully shares that her coworker, Trina, and her boss, Roger, tease her for having her leg in a cast. Ronnie then beats up Roger and warns him and Trina not to harass Nell again. Depressed, he is persuaded by fellow security officer Dennis to spend the day doing a wide variety of drugs and assaulting skateboarding teenagers. At the end of the day, Dennis reveals that he is the one who has been stealing from the mall. Ronnie insists this is wrong and, after a brief argument, Dennis knocks him unconscious and flees.

Ronnie decides to go undercover in order to catch the flasher, but when he catches Brandi having sex with Harrison in the parking lot, he confronts her in front of onlookers at the mall the next day, blowing his cover and destroying a display case. The police are summoned and Ronnie fights them off, defeating the regular officers, until he is overpowered by Harrison and arrested.

A few days later, Ronnie's mother gives him a postcard from Dennis in Mexico, who respects Ronnie for caring so much. Ronnie returns to the mall, despondent that he no longer works security. He discovers that Nell's cast has been removed. She kisses him just before the flasher arrives and exposes himself to the food court.

After a brief chase, Ronnie incapacitates the flasher by shooting him in the shoulder. As he picks the bleeding flasher up, Brandi thanks him, but he rejects and publicly humiliates her for sleeping with Harrison. Ronnie brings the flasher to the police station, gloating that he has won by apprehending him. Ronnie is subsequently interviewed by the local news, having regained his job and begun dating Nell.

Cast
 Seth Rogen as Ronnie Barnhardt
 Ray Liotta as Detective Harrison
 Collette Wolfe as Nell Jones
 Anna Faris as Brandi Gaffney
 Michael Peña as Dennis Chavante
 Jesse Plemons as Charles Gaffney
 Aziz Ansari as Saddamn
 Dan Bakkedahl as Mark
 John Yuan as John Yuen
 Matthew Yuan as Matt Yuen
 Celia Weston as Mrs. Barnhardt
 Randy Gambill as Pervert
 Patton Oswalt as Roger
 Ben Best as Detective Okarski
 Danny McBride as Caucasian Crackhead
 Lauren Miller as Trina
 Alston Brown as Bruce
 Cody Midthunder as D-Rock

Production
The film was shot on location in the largely abandoned Winrock Shopping Center in Albuquerque, New Mexico. Filming began around May 2008.

At the request of the studio, during the test screening stage the filmmakers created a version of the film that was more toned down, but that was scrapped as the test screening scores for the new version were lower than the original.

Writing
Observe and Report was written and directed by Jody Hill. The megalomaniac, manic-depressive security guard Ronnie has been compared to Travis Bickle in Martin Scorsese's Taxi Driver; Hill has mentioned it and also Scorsese's The King of Comedy as significant influences.

The film has drawn some attention for having a plot revolving around a "mall cop" like the 2009 family comedy Paul Blart: Mall Cop. Seth Rogen, in an interview with GQ, noted his awareness of another "mall cop" movie being made:

However, in 2019, Rogen expressed anger at his discovery that Paul Blart: Mall Cop had "gotten the script and ripped us off, even though they're very different movies...One way or another I'm not thrilled with Paul Blart: Mall Cop in relation to how Observe and Report was received."

In comparing the two, Observe and Report was dubbed by some reviewers as "the dark mall cop movie".

Reception

Critical response
On Rotten Tomatoes, the film holds an approval rating of 51% based on 211 reviews, with an average rating of 5.60/10. The site's critics consensus reads: "Though it has a mean streak, and does not cater to all tastes, Observe and Report has gut-busting laughs and a fully committed Seth Rogen in irresistible form." On Metacritic, the film received a weighted average score of 54 out of 100, based on 35 critics, indicating "mixed or average reviews". Audiences polled by CinemaScore gave the film an average grade of "C" on an A+ to F scale.

Peter Travers of Rolling Stone gave the film a rating of three out of four stars, saying, "Hill is fearless at pushing hot buttons: date rape, shooting up and worse," and "Rogen is nutso hilarious, nailing every note of mirth and malice." Conversely, Peter Bradshaw of The Guardian awarded the movie one star out of five and disparaged Rogen's performance, writing "for Seth Rogen fans like me, this charmless, heavy-handed and cynical comedy is an uncomfortable experience." Paul Byrnes wrote in, "Much of the movie is just plain vicious. At best, it's sad and grotesque, rather than hilarious," while Manohla Dargis of The New York Times stated "if you thought Abu Ghraib was a laugh riot you might love Observe and Report." She continued, "It's far better and certainly easier ... to sit back and relax and enjoy the show. That, after all, is precisely what Hollywood banks on each time it manufactures a new entertainment for a public that—as the stupid, violent characters who hold up a mirror to that public indicate—it views with contempt."

The film drew criticism for its comedic portrayal of date rape from a number of notable publications, including Vulture, The Sydney Morning Herald, and The New York Times. On their date, Brandi drinks copious amounts of alcohol at the restaurant and afterward asks Ronnie for a bottle of his prescription medication, clonazepam, a combination which leaves Brandi so incapacitated that she can neither stand on her own nor open her eyes. Despite the fact that Brandi is clearly inebriated and unfit to give consent, Ronnie kisses her after she vomits and engages in intercourse with her as she lies motionless on the bed, stopping once he notices she appears to be unconscious, before Brandi asks him why he stopped.

During an interview on The Howard Stern Show, Rogen stated he was disappointed by the film's overall reception, but proud that "the only two people who liked it" were Stern and David Letterman.

Box office
The film grossed $11 million in its opening weekend (an average of $4,085 at 2,727 theaters), finishing in fourth place, behind Hannah Montana: The Movie, Fast & Furious, and Monsters vs. Aliens (also featuring Rogen). It ultimately grossed $27 million at the box office. To date, it is the third lowest-grossing film of Rogen's starring career, before Take this Waltz and The Interview.

Release
The film was released on April 10, 2009 in the United States.

Home media
The film was released on DVD and Blu-ray on September 22, 2009.

Soundtrack

Observe and Report: Original Motion Picture Soundtrack was released on April 7, 2009 by New Line Records.

 
 "When I Paint My Masterpiece" by The Band – 4:18
 "The Man" by Patto – 6:07
 "Lightsabre Cocksucking Blues" by McLusky – 1:51
 "Sittin' Back Easy" by Patto – 3:35
 "Brain" by The Action – 2:59
 "Over Under Sideways Down" by The Yardbirds – 2:22
 "Dwarves Must Die" by Dwarves – 1:23
 "Help Is on Its Way" by Little River Band – 4:00
 "Where Is My Mind?" by City Wolf – 4:27
 "Babyteeth" by Pyramid – 4:10
 "Observe and Report Score Suite" by Joseph Stephens – 4:04
 "Super Freek (Remix)" by Amanda Blank, Nina Cream, and Aaron LaCrate – 2:26

The Queen songs "It's Late" and "The Hero" are featured in the film but not included on the soundtrack.

References

External links
 
 
 
 
 

2009 films
2009 black comedy films
American black comedy films
American satirical films
Bipolar disorder in fiction
Films about security and surveillance
Films directed by Jody Hill
Films set in shopping malls
Films shot in New Mexico
Films produced by Donald De Line
Legendary Pictures films
American vigilante films
Warner Bros. films
2000s vigilante films
2009 comedy films
2000s English-language films
2000s American films